The Tiba (project name: S81) is an Iranian car made by Saipa, that was unveiled in December 2008 and originally named "Miniature".

Price has been estimated to be less than 7,000 dollars. The car platform has been designed by Saipa, and its safety is reasonable. In its production the services of some 122 local manufacturers have been utilized and about 810 parts have been produced.

A new subsidiary, Saipa Kashan will take up production of the car. The share of Tiba in Saipa's exports is expected to be around 20 percent by 2011. Saipa Tiba is being sold in Ukraine since 2012.

Technical specifications

Based on a new X200 platform, the new engine has been designed according to this specification: 4-cylinder 80 hp 1503cc engine and 5-speed manual transmission, which have been both modified in size and power by the German FEV company, with a fuel economy of 42MPG (5.6L/100 km) in highways and 33MPG in the cities. (7.2L/100 km) The car is also relatively well-equipped, with a CD Player, anti-theft technology, customizable seat position and front light angle, and automatic front windows. In 2014, only 20% of all auto-parts used in the production of the Saipa Tiba cars were domestically manufactured.

The car's safety features are reasonable and equipped with driver's and passenger's airbag and an ABS have been installed on base-models. Along with other accessories such as automatic rear windows, auto-climate control, aluminum rims, and a remote control It could be ordered optionally during purchase.

Tiba 2 
The Tiba 2 is the hatchback version of the Tiba.

See also
 Saipa Group
 Iranian automobile industry

References

Cars of Iran
Saipa vehicles
Front-wheel-drive vehicles
Cars introduced in 2008
Cars introduced in 2009
Cars introduced in 2013